Chemaudin is a former commune in the Doubs department in the Bourgogne-Franche-Comté region in eastern France. On 1 January 2017, it was merged into the new commune Chemaudin et Vaux.

Population

See also
 Communes of the Doubs department

References

External links

Official website 

Former communes of Doubs